HMS Badminton was a Hunt-class minesweeper of the Aberdare sub-class built for the Royal Navy during World War I. She was not finished in time to participate in the First World War and was sold for scrap in 1928.

Design and description
The Aberdare sub-class were enlarged versions of the original Hunt-class ships with a more powerful armament. The ships displaced  at normal load. The ships' complement consisted of 74 officers and ratings.

The ships had two vertical triple-expansion steam engines, each driving one shaft, using steam provided by two Yarrow boilers.

The Aberdare sub-class was armed with a quick-firing (QF)  gun forward of the bridge and a QF twelve-pounder (76.2 mm) anti-aircraft gun aft. Some ships were fitted with six- or three-pounder guns in lieu of the twelve-pounder.

Construction and career
HMS Badminton was built by the Ardrossan Dry Dock & Shipbuilding Company and  launched on 18 March 1918. Badminton was listed as part of the 7th (North Sea) Minesweeping Flotilla, based at Grimsby at the end of the war. After the war ended, the 7th Flotilla, including Badminton, was deployed to Ijmuiden in the Netherlands to help to clear the large German minefields off the Dutch coast. In the early 1920s, Badminton took part in coastal patrols off Ireland, mainly in supply and support role to Coastguard stations, but also targeting possible gun smuggling.

Notes

References
 *
 
 
 
 

 

Hunt-class minesweepers (1916)
1918 ships